Percy William Doyle CB (1806? – 21 February 1887) was a British diplomat and "a popular member of London society".

Biography
The youngest son of General Sir C. W. Doyle, he was first attached to the British Mission in Washington in 1825. He was appointed in 1829 to Madrid. In 1831 in Madrid he visited one of his father's close friends, José de Palafox. Percy Doyle was appointed in 1836 Paid Attaché at Constantinople. He was appointed on 6 December 1842 Secretary of Legation to Mexico and was appointed on 4 January 1843 British Chargé d'Affaires to Mexico but diplomatic relations were broken off later in that year because of an incident involving Antonio López de Santa Anna. In 1847 Doyle was reappointed as British Chargé d'Affaires to Mexico and, embarking aboard  on 13 October 1847, arrived in Mexico in December of that year. From 24 December 1851 to 19 February 1858 Doyle was British Minister Plenipotentiary to Mexico. However, his heath failed him in 1856 and in 1858 he retired from the Diplomatic Service on a pension. In March 1858 he was appointed CB (Companion of the Order of the Bath).

References

1806 births
1888 deaths
19th-century British diplomats
Companions of the Order of the Bath